The 1953–54 season was the 39th in the history of the Isthmian League, an English football competition.

Bromley were champions, winning their third Isthmian League title.

League table

References

Isthmian League seasons
I